The 2019 Monster Energy NASCAR All-Star Race (XXXV) was a Monster Energy NASCAR Cup Series stock car exhibition race held on May 18, 2019 at Charlotte Motor Speedway in Concord, North Carolina. Contested over 88 laps—extended from 85 laps due to an overtime finish, it was the second exhibition race of the 2019 Monster Energy NASCAR Cup Series season.

Report

Background

The All-Star Race was open to race winners from last season through the 2019 Digital Ally 400 at Kansas Speedway and all previous All-Star race winners and Monster Race NASCAR Cup champions who had attempted to qualify for every race in 2019 were eligible to compete in the All-Star Race.

Entry list

Monster Energy Open

Monster Energy NASCAR All-Star Race

Practice

Monster Energy Open/All-Star first practice

Monster Energy Open final practice

Monster Energy NASCAR All-Star Race final practice

Qualifying (Open)

Open qualifying results

Qualifying (All-Star Race)

All-Star Race qualifying results

Monster Energy Open

Monster Energy Open results

All-Star Race

Race
The pole-sitter was Clint Bowyer, although the person who dominated the race was Kevin Harvick, seeking his second win in the All-Star Race and his first All-Star win since 2007. Kyle Larson took the lead in the #42 Chevrolet with 13 laps to go and held it to the end, winning his first All-Star Race victory.

Post-race Scuffle
On the final lap of the race, pole-sitter Clint Bowyer chopped into the front of Ryan Newman's #6 Acorns Ford Fusion, almost taking both cars out of the race. When the checkered flag waved and during the cool-down lap, Newman tapped Bowyer in the back, igniting a post-race scuffle that ended with Bowyer running up to Newman's car and punching him several times while Newman was strapped in his car. Both drivers were summoned to the NASCAR Hauler post-race, but no penalties were assessed to either driver.

All-Star Race results

Media

Television
Fox Sports was the television broadcaster of the race in the United States. The lap-by-lap announcer, Mike Joy, was accompanied on the broadcast by retired NASCAR drivers Jeff Gordon and Darrell Waltrip. This was Waltrip's final planned All Star race in the booth, as he retired from NASCAR broadcasting after the June 23rd Toyota/Save Mart 350 (although he was a guest during the 2020 broadcast). Jamie Little, Vince Welch, and Matt Yocum reported from pit lane.

Radio
Motor Racing Network (MRN) continued their longstanding relationship with the track to broadcast the race on radio. The lead announcers for the race's broadcast were Alex Hayden, Jeff Striegle and Rusty Wallace. The network also implemented two announcers on each side of the track: Dave Moody in turns 1 and 2 and Kyle Rickey in turns 3 and 4. Winston Kelly, Kim Coon, Steve Post and Dillon Welch were the network's pit lane reporters. The network's broadcast was also simulcasted on Sirius XM NASCAR Radio.

References

Monster Energy NASCAR All-Star Race
Monster Energy NASCAR All-Star Race
Monster Energy NASCAR All-Star Race
NASCAR races at Charlotte Motor Speedway
NASCAR All-Star Race